Americans for Safe Access v. Drug Enforcement Administration was a case in which the U.S. Court of Appeals for the D.C. Circuit held that the DEA's denial of a petition by plaintiff Americans for Safe Access for removal of cannabis from Schedule I of the Controlled Substances Act survives review under the deferential arbitrary and capricious standard.  requires that cannabis be found to have no "currently accepted medical use" in order to remain in Schedule I. This DEA, pursuant to regulations that the court had approved in Alliance for Cannabis Therapeutics v. DEA, interpreted this to require "adequate and well-controlled studies proving efficacy" in order for cannabis to be removed from Schedule I. The court deferred to the agency's interpretation and found that substantial evidence supported the DEA's determination that such studies do not exist. This case was the third attempt to get the D.C. Circuit to order that cannabis be rescheduled.

Further reading

References

Controlled Substances Act
Cannabis law in the United States
2012 in cannabis